Melissa Jo Peltier is a New York-based American producer and author. She produced, wrote and directed the 1994 A&E documentary mini-series Titanic: Death of a Dream and Titanic: The Legend Lives On, the show Dog Whisperer with Cesar Millan. She has also co-authored five books with Millan on the subject of raising and training dogs. In 2013, she published her first novel, entitled Reality Boulevard.

Peltier has won two News & Documentary Emmy awards and received the Humanitas Prize in 1993 for the documentary Scared Silent: Exposing and Ending Child Abuse.

Background and career
Peltier was born and raised in New England, graduating cum laude from Pomona College in Claremont.

She directed and co-wrote the primetime documentary special, Scared Silent: Exposing and Ending Child Abuse, hosted by Oprah Winfrey, released in 1992. The documentary earned her a Humanitas Prize. Later, she directed and wrote the Breaking the Silence: Kids Against Child Abuse, which won a Peabody Award in 1995. In 1994, she was producer, director and writer of A&E’s four-hour miseries, Titanic: Death of a Dream and Titanic: The Legend Lives On. Peltier received the News and Documentary Emmy Award for this documentary for outstanding documentary writing.

In 1996, Peltier co-founded MPH Entertainment with two other business partners. She executive-produced the TV show Dog Whisperer with Cesar Millan (2004-2012). She also wrote and directed multiple episodes for the series.

In 2010, she produced the movie White Irish Drinkers, which was directed by her husband.

Books 
Peltier has co-authored, with Cesar Millan, five books all of which became New York Times Bestsellers. She also co-authored The Mommy Docs Ultimate Guide to Pregnancy and Birth in 2011.

Reality Boulevard 
In 2014, Peltier wrote the novel, Reality Boulevard. The story of the novel is based on what happens to a group of idealistic filmmakers after their long running documentary series is cancelled and they are thrust into the assembly line world of reality TV. The book was named to Kirkus Reviews' Best Books of 2013.

Selected filmography 
{| class="wikitable sortable"
|-
| Year
| Title
| Notes
|-
| 1992
| Scared Silent: Exposing and Ending Child Abuse
| Director, co-writer
|-
| 1993
| Break the Silence: Kids Against Child Abuse. 
| Director, writer
|-
| 1994
| Titanic Death of a Dream & The Legend Lives On| Producer, director and writer
|-
| 1996
| The Real Las Vegas| Executive producer, writer
|-
| 1998
| Eco-Challenge Australia| Executive producer
|-
| 1998
| Lusitania: Murder on the Atlantic| Producer, writer
|-
| 1999
| The History of Sex| Executive producer, writer
|-
| 2000
| Founding Fathers| Executive producer, writer
|-
| 2002
| Founding Brothers| Executive producer, writer
|-
| 2002
| My Big Fat Greek Wedding| Co-executive producer
|-
| 2003
| Nightwaves| Screenwriter
|-
| 2004
| The New Roswell: Kecksburg Exposed| Director, writer
|-
| 2004 - 2012
| Dog Whisperer with Cesar Millan| Executive producer, writer and segment director
|-
| 2010
| White Irish Drinkers| Producer
|-
| 2022
| The Game Is Up| Director, writer
|}

 Personal life 
Peltier is married to John Gray, a screenwriter, director and producer.

Bibliography Cesar's Way: The Natural, Everyday Guide to Understanding and Correcting Common Dog Problems co-authored with Cesar Millan. (2007). Be the Pack Leader: Use Cesar's Way to Transform Your Dog . . . and Your Life co-authored with Cesar Millan. (2007). A Member of the Family: Cesar Millan's Guide to a Lifetime of Fulfillment with Your Dog co-authored with Cesar Millan. (2008). How to Raise the Perfect Dog: Through Puppyhood and Beyond co-authored with Cesar Millan. (2009). Cesar's Rules: Your Way to Train a Well-Behaved Dog co-authored with Cesar Millan. (2010). The Mommy Docs' Ultimate Guide to Pregnancy and Birth co-authored with Yvonne Bohn, Allison Hill, Alane Park. (2011). Reality Boulevard. (2013). 

 Awards and honors 
Women in Film Award - 1991
Humanitas Prize for Scared Silent: Exposing and Ending Child Abuse - 1993
News and Documentary Emmy Award for Outstanding writing for Titanic: Death of a Dream'' - 1995

References 

Living people
Film producers from California
Pomona College alumni
Year of birth missing (living people)